Salarium is a SaaS end-to-end payroll automation company that provides enterprise payroll system software for small, medium and large businesses. It is headquartered in Hong Kong, and has an office in Manila, Philippines.

Salarium was founded in 2013. In February 2014, Salarium won a global contest in Geneva, Switzerland and landed an equity investment worth $500,000 from Seedstars World (SSW). As of April 2021, Salarium has a Google review rating of 2.9, a Glassdoor rating of 2.5, and a Capterra rating of 3.2.

History

Salarium was founded by Judah Hirsch in 2013.

September 2014: Salarium was bootstrapped until it received its first round of investment in 2014 after winning the 2nd Seedstars World (SSW) startup competition.

March 2015: Salarium signed a partnership with VMoney Inc. to use VMoney's funds disbursement platform to support its payroll automation software.

April 2015: Salarium partnered with PyxPay, a mobile payment firm, in an attempt to increase its service offerings. With this, Salarium would have an e-wallet that can pay employees anywhere in the world.

April 2016: Salarium partnered with GCash, a mobile payment company under Globe Telecom.

December 2017: SALPay partnered with Union Bank of the Philippines, to incorporate its EON platform with the SALPay app.

March 2019: Salarium expanded its operations to Davao City, Mindanao.

July 2019: Salarium opened new operations in Cebu City, Cebu.

August 2019: Salarium announced the launch of its updated payroll software, version 3.0.

References

Financial software companies
Software companies of Hong Kong
Financial services companies established in 2013